Huépac Municipality is a municipality in Sonora in north-western Mexico.

Neighboring municipalities are  Banámichi, Cumpas, Aconchi and San Felipe de Jesús.  Huépac is connected to Banámichi and Aconchi by a paved highway.

References

Municipalities of Sonora